Utpal Kumar Basu (উৎপল কুমার বসু) (3 August 1939 – 3 October 2015) was a Bengali poet and story teller.

Life 
Born in Bhowanipore area of pre-independence Kolkata (1937), Utpal Kumar Basu spent his school days in Baharampur (Murshidabad, West Bengal) and Dinhata (Coochbehar, North Bengal). A geologist by education, Basu has traveled far and wide over the seas and years. An educationist by profession, Basu is recognized as a trend setter in modern Bengali Poetry. Utpal Kumar Basu was an eminent vernacular poet, educationist and translator.  He began writing while studying at Scottish Church College and became a part of the Krittibash group of young Bengali poets. From the very first collection of poems entitled Chaitre Rochito Kobita -1956, he found a unique diction of language, expression and form for his poetry. He had chosen mysticism over sentimentalism, vivid objective observation over lyricism.
After receiving his master's degree in geology from Presidency College he joined Ashutosh College as a lecturer where he met his future wife Santana, a lecturer in the English Department.(Santana was previously awarded the Indira Sinha Gold Medal for securing the highest aggregate of marks at the B.A, examination from Bihar University in 1955 among girl students.) 
Utpal left for England in the mid -sixties where he spent a decade as an educationist and associated himself with various socialist organisations. Returning to India in the late seventies he worked as a project officer for the University Grants Commission, an advisor and teacher at St Xavier's College in the field of Mass Communication. 
He died on 3 October 2015 in Kolkata.

Critic 

Utpal Kumar Basu was a Bengali poet and story teller who started his literary journey in the city of Kolkata in 1950s. From the very first collection published (Chaitrye Rochito Kobita, 1956), he found a unique diction of language, expression and form for his poetry. He had chosen mysticism over sentimentalism, vivid objective observation over lyricism. Being a geologist by education he is known for his witty but meticulous approach towards the nature, objects and life, which may seem to be similar to that of a scientist.

Second and third collection of poems by Utpal Kumar Basu, namely Puri Series (1964) and Abar Puri Series (1978) presented an astonishing new diction to Bengali literature, which are popularly referred to as Famous Travel Poetry Of Utpal. Be its form or content, uniqueness in those poems has created perhaps the most valuable impact on modern Bengali poetry over the years. In the decades to follow those two brief collections of poems by Basu have resulted in a turning point in contemporary Bengali poetry and it has been recognized as a benchmark by the younger generation of poets to follow. But Utpal Kumar Basu kept on experimenting with his form and language. According to him -"The evolution of form has to be rapid and continuous, whereas the concept evolves slowly, maybe once in a century.(ধূসর আতাগাছ )"

Utpal Kumar Basu eventually met American poet Allen Ginsberg in Kolkata in the early sixties and both shared a great friendship. Basu connected himself with Hungry generation literary movement in 60s and was compelled to resign from his job as a lecturer in a Kolkata college. He traveled far and wide, over the seas and years in Europe doing some part-time jobs to survive. In England he associated himself with various socialist organizations. His poetry had to pause temporarily but only to find a new path to flow in the form of his famous "travel poems" and published a number of small, unassuming collections of poems with the lesser known Little Magazine publishing houses. At this time, he was also writing regularly on a variety of subjects for popular Bengali dailies including Aajkaal and AnandaBazar Patrika. Utpal spent nearly fourteen years in London 1964-77 and returned to Kolkata and joined Chitrabani-an organization closely linked to University Grants Commission and St. Xavier's College Kolkata. He was engaged in planning programmes and also conducting Mass Communication classes.
He also translated works of such eminent writers as Ayappa Pannikar, Kamala Das and edited a translation of a collection of Mizo Poems and Songs for Sahitya Akademi.
 
Translations of his poems have been published regularly in the London Magazine. Utpal Kumar Basu died on 3 October 2015 in Kolkata after a prolonged illness. 
He was survived by son Firoze, assistant professor (English) in the Department of Humanities, MCKV Institute of Engineering, Howrah, Kolkata. Santana, after long teaching stints in Spastic Society of Eastern India and St. Augustine Day School Kolkata, died in November 2018 after a brief illness. 
Utpal continues to be an inspiration for little magazine publishers and young poets of Bengal.
Utpalkumar Basu has been awarded the Ananda Puraskar by the ABP group of publications in 2006 and the Rabindra Puraskar by the Paschim Banga Bangla Academy 2011 both for his collection of poems Sukh Dukhser Sathi. In 2014 he received the Sahitya Academy Award for his collection of poems entitled Piya Mana Bhabe. He was awarded the Sahitya Akademi Translation Prize 2018 for his translation into Bengali of Srimati Kamala Das's collection of poems entitled Only The Soul Knows How To Sing.(posthumous)

Utpal Kumar Basu works 
 Chaitrye Rochito Kobita (চৈত্রে রচিত কবিতা) [1956]
 Puri Series (পুরী সিরিজ) [1964]
 Narokhadok, collection of short stories (নরখাদক) [1970]
 Abar Puri Series (আবার পুরী সিরিজ) [1978]
 Lochondas Karigar(লোচনদাস কারিগর) [1982]
 Khandobaichitrer Din (খন্ডবৈচিত্র্যের দিন) [1986]
 Srestho kobita (শ্রেষ্ট কবিতা) [1991]
 Dhusar Atagach, collection of free prose (ধূসর আতাগাছ) [1994]
 Salma Jorir Kaaj (সলমা জরির কাজ) [1995]
 Kahabotir Nach (কহবতীর নাচ) [1996]
 Night School (নাইটস্কুল) [1998]
 Tusu Amar Chintamoni (তুসু আমার চিন্তামনি)
 Meenyuddha (মীনযুদ্ধ)
 Bokshigunje Padmapare (বক্সিগঞ্জে পদ্মাপাড়ে)
 Annadata Joseph (অন্নদাতা জোসেফ)
 Sukh Duhkher sathi (সুখদুঃখের সাথী)
 Translation from Safo [সাফোর কবিতা (অনুবাদ)]
 Collected poems (কবিতা সংগ্রহ)
 Collected prose (গদ্যসংগ্রহ)
 Bela Egarotar Rod
 Baba Bhoy Korche  (বাবা ভয় করছে)
 Piya Mana Bhabe (poetry) [Won Sahitya Akademi Award, 2014]
 Hanscholar Path-Poetry, Long interview, Sketches (January-2015)
 Sadabrahmoman-collection of short stories, sketches and criticism-2015
Tokyo Laundry-collection of short stories, sketches and criticism-2016
Dear Sm-collection of  personal letters written  to wife Santana Basu-2016
Collected poems -2 (কবিতা সংগ্রহ)-2017
Saratsar-1-Poems and Prose -2017
Dhritiman Sen er Diary Prose Saptarshi Prakashan 2021

Lokomata Debi'r Kowotola-Humorous critical sketches of programs aired on Kolkata Doordarshan in the 1990s under a pen -name-Deys Publishing 2022

References 

1939 births
2015 deaths
Bengali Hindus
Bengali poets
Bengali male poets
20th-century Bengalis
21st-century Bengalis
20th-century Bengali poets
21st-century Bengali poets
Indian poets
Indian critics
Indian literary critics
Indian male writers
Indian male poets
Indian translators
20th-century Indian writers
21st-century Indian male writers
20th-century Indian poets
21st-century Indian poets
21st-century Indian writers
20th-century Indian male writers
20th-century Indian translators
21st-century Indian translators
Scottish Church College alumni
University of Calcutta alumni
Academic staff of the University of Calcutta
Recipients of the Sahitya Akademi Prize for Translation
Poets from West Bengal
Writers from Kolkata
People from Kolkata district